Subgiant is a UK electro trio founded in London, consisting of Olly Maw, Dan Hayes, and Tushar Joshi, formed in 2004. Subgiant have made appearances at festivals such as Glastonbury, Bestival, Blissfields and Glade Festival as well as various clubs worldwide.

History

Olly Maw and Dan Hayes met as bassist and DJ (respectively) in 2000, and formed what, in its early days, was a dub act. In 2004 Tushar Joshi joined on electro drums after a chance encounter at Blissfields festival 2003. The band then concentrated on the live performance of electro music-orientated music. Dale Titus joined the band as its vocalist- specialising in rap. Lizzy Munro was the last to join the band as their saxophone player but had to leave in 2018 due to moving away. 

The band soon found themselves breaking on to the UK festival scene, with appearances at Glastonbury, Bestival, Blissfields. This was soon followed by the band's first album, 'Advances in Twig Technology', on Blissfields Records. BBC Radio 1 DJ Rob Da Bank booked the band for three consecutive years at the Bestival on the Isle of Wight, and this was followed by appearances at The Levellers` Beautiful Days (festival), and the Larmer Tree Festival. The band continue to play at many festivals in the summer months, and at clubs up and down the country throughout the year.

Musicology

The band play many genres of dance music through their gigs and mainly concentrate on Electro, House, Breaks, DubStep, Drum and Bass, Techno and Trance.

As of 2019, Subgiant continue to tour their live act.

Discography

CD
Mayday (Nomansland 2017)
All Day (Skytrack Records 2013)
[This (album) 2009]
Advances in Twig Technology (Blissfields Records 2004)
Global Control (Blissfields Records 2006)

British electronic music groups
British house music groups
Musical groups established in 2004